Hata is a constituency of the Uttar Pradesh Legislative Assembly covering the Hata Nagar Palika in the Kushinagar district of Uttar Pradesh, India.

Hata is one of five assembly constituencies in the Kushi Nagar Lok Sabha constituency. Since 2008, this assembly constituency is numbered 334 amongst 403 constituencies.

This seat belonged to Bharatiya Janta Party candidate Pawan Kedia, who won in last Assembly election of 2017 Uttar Pradesh Legislative Elections by defeating Samajwadi Party candidate Radheshyam Singh by a margin of 53,076 votes.

Members of Legislative Assembly (MLAs)

Election results

References

External links
 

Assembly constituencies of Uttar Pradesh
Kushinagar district